Pink M was a Montenegrin cable television channel based in Podgorica. It was established on 3 September 2018 as Pink Media when Pink Media Group sold its terrestrial commercial channels "Pink M" (now Nova M) and "Pink BH" (now Nova BH) to The United Group.

Programming
Pink M channel lineup consists of programmes from Pink's terrestrial channel Pink TV or Pink World intended to linear broadcasting or re-broadcasting on the Montenegro market. By concept and name, a similar television channel called Pink BH which exists in Bosnia and Herzegovina.

News
 Minut 2 - daily news bulletin, every full hour - duration 2 minutes with an overview of the most important news for and from Montenegro.

Entertainment
 Zadruga - reality TV show from Serbia.

Series, Telenovelas
October 2019:

References

External links

Television stations in Montenegro
Television channels and stations established in 2018